Robert George Bergman is an American chemist. He is Professor of the Graduate School and Gerald E. K. Branch Distinguished Professor Emeritus at the University of California, Berkeley.

Early life and education 

Born in Chicago, Robert Bergman was the son of Joseph J. and Stella Bergman, née Horowitz. In 1963 he graduated from Carleton College with a degree in chemistry. Under the supervision of Jerome A. Berson, he received a PhD in 1966 from the University of Wisconsin-Madison. From 1966 to 1967 he was a NATO postdoctoral fellow at Ronald Breslow's laboratory at Columbia University, New York City.

Career 
Bergman began his independent career at the California Institute of Technology in Pasadena where he was an Arthur Noyes Research Instructor (1967–1969), assistant professor (1969–1971), associate professor (1971–1973), and full professor (1973–1977). From 1977 to 2002, he was a chemistry professor at the University of California, Berkeley and since 1978 has also been a researcher at the Lawrence Berkeley National Laboratory. In 2002 he was appointed Gerald E. K. Branch Distinguished Professor of Chemistry. Bergman transitioned to Emeritus status in 2016 and now holds to the titles of Professor of the Graduate School and Gerald E. K. Branch Distinguished Professor Emeritus.

Research 
Bergman works in the field of organic chemistry. He first investigated the reaction mechanisms of organic reactions at Caltech. He developed methods for the representation of very reactive molecules, for example 1,3-diradicals and vinyl cations. In 1972, he discovered the thermal cyclization of cis-1,5-hexadiyne-3-ene to 1,4-dehydrobenzene-diradicals, now known as the Bergman cyclization. This reaction later played a major role in understanding the mode of action of enediyne antitumor antibiotics. Since the mid-1970s, Bergman has also been working in the field of organometallic chemistry. He contributed to the synthesis and reaction of organometallic complexes and investigated organometallic compounds with metal-oxygen and metal-nitrogen bonds. He also discovered the first soluble organometallic complexes of the transition metals, to which the addition of a saturated hydrocarbon (C-H activation, C-H insertion) succeeded.

Personal life 
Since June 17, 1965, Bergman has been married. They have two sons.

Awards and honours 
 1969: Alfred P. Sloan Fellowship
1970: Teacher-Scholar Award (Camille and Henry Dreyfus Foundation)
 1978: Student Government Award for Excellence in Teaching (California Institute of Technology)
 1984: Sherman Fairchild Distinguished Scholar
1985: Distinguished Alumni Achievement Award (Carleton College)
 1985: John Bailar Medal (University of Illinois)
 1986: ACS Award in Organometallic Chemistry (American Chemical Society)
 1987: Arthur C. Cope Scholar award (American Chemical Society)
 1990: Edgar Fahs Smith Award (American Chemical Society)
 1990: Ira Remsen Award (American Chemical Society)
 1991: MERIT Award (National Institutes of Health)
 1994: Ernest Orlando Lawrence Award (U.S. Department of Energy)
 1995: Honorary PhD degree of Carleton College
 1996: Arthur C. Cope Award (American Chemical Society)
 1999: Chemical Pioneer Award (American Institute of Chemists)
 2001: Edward Leete Award for Teaching and Research in Organic Chemistry (American Chemical Society)
 2002: Teaching Award (UC Berkeley Department of Chemistry)
 2003: James Flack Norris Award in Physical Organic Chemistry (American Chemical Society)
 2003: Monie A. Ferst Award (Sigma Xi)
 2004: Award for Excellence in Technology Transfer (Lawrence Berkeley National Laboratory)
 2007: NAS Award in Chemical Sciences (National Academy of Sciences)
 2013: George A. Olah Award in Hydrocarbon or Petroleum Chemistry
 2014: Technion-Israel Institute of Technology Distinguished Schulich Lectureship Award
2014: Welch Award in Chemistry
 2014: Royal Society of Chemistry Robert Robinson Award
 2017: Wolf Prize in Chemistry

Memberships 
 1963: Phi Beta Kappa
 1964: Phi Lambda Upsilon
 1966: Sigma Xi
 1984: National Academy of Sciences
 1984: American Academy of Arts and Sciences
 1995: California Academy of Sciences
 1999: American Association for the Advancement of Science

Literature 
 Who's Who in America. 2007, p. 341.

References

External links 
 Robert G. Bergman on the side of his research group
 Robert G. Bergman on berkeley.edu

1942 births
Living people
People from Chicago
21st-century American chemists
UC Berkeley College of Chemistry faculty
Lawrence Berkeley National Laboratory people
Columbia University alumni
Carleton College alumni
University of Wisconsin–Madison alumni
Wolf Prize in Chemistry laureates